The Germany women's national basketball team is the women's basketball team that represents Germany in international competitions. It is governed by the German Basketball Federation (DBB).

Competition record

Roster
The roster for the EuroBasket Women 2015 qualification.

|}
| valign="top" |
Head coach

Assistant coach(es)

Legend
Club – describes lastclub before the tournament
|}

Notes

See also
 East Germany women's national basketball team
 Germany women's national under-19 basketball team
 Germany women's national under-17 basketball team
 Germany women's national 3x3 team

References

External links

 Official website
 FIBA profile
 Presentation at EuroBasket.com
 Archived records

 
 
Women's national basketball teams